The first professional Italian National Cyclo-cross Championships were held in 1930. The winner was Armando Zucchini.

The winner wears the Italian national championship jersey following the event and throughout the next cyclo-cross season.

Winners
 1930 Armando Zucchini
 1931 Antonio Castellari
 1932 Luigi Ferrando
 1933 Armando Zucchini
 1934 Severino Canavesi
 1935 Luigi Ferrando
 1936 Luigi Ferrando
 1937 Bernardo Rogora
 1938 Luigi Ferrando
 1939 Luigi Ferrando
 1940 not held
 1941 Sergio Lampitelli
 1942 GMario Gentili
 1943 Giovanni Fulcheri
 1944 Valerio Berteotti
 1945 not held
 1946 Francesco Prina
 1947 Raffaele Abate
 1948 Francesco Prina
 1949 Sergio Toigo
 1950 Sergio Toigo
 1951 Luigi Malabrocca
 1952 Graziano Pertusi
 1953 Luigi Malabrocca
 1954 Graziano Pertusi
 1955 Mario Rossi
 1956 Amerigo Severini
 1957 Romano Ferri
 1958 Graziano Pertusi
 1959 Renato Longo
 1960 Renato Longo
 1961 Amerigo Severini
 1962 Renato Longo
 1963 Amerigo Severini
 1964 Renato Longo
 1965 Renato Longo
 1966 Renato Longo
 1967 Renato Longo
 1968 Renato Longo
 1969 Renato Longo
 1970 Renato Longo
 1971 Renato Longo
 1972 Renato Longo
 1973 Franco Livian
 1974 title not rewarded
 1975 Wladimiro Panizza
 1976 Wladimiro Panizza
 1977 Franco Bitossi
 1978 Franco Bitossi
 1979 Antonio Saronni
 1980 Antonio Saronni
 1981 Ottavio Paccagnella
 1982 Antonio Saronni
 1983 Antonio Saronni
 1984 Ottavio Paccagnella
 1985 Ottavio Paccagnella
 1986 Ottavio Paccagnella
 1987 Ottavio Paccagnella
 1988 Ottavio Paccagnella
 1989 Claudio Vandelli
 1990 Fabricio Margon
 1991 Fabricio Margon
 1992 Fabricio Margon
 1993 Fabricio Margon
 1994 Daniele Pontoni
 1995 Daniele Pontoni
 1996 Daniele Pontoni
 1997 Daniele Pontoni
 1998 Daniele Pontoni
 1999 Daniele Pontoni
 2000 Daniele Pontoni
 2001 Daniele Pontoni
 2002 Daniele Pontoni
 2003 Daniele Pontoni
 2004 Daniele Pontoni
 2005 Enrico Franzoi
 2006 Enrico Franzoi
 2007 Enrico Franzoi
 2008 Marco Aurelio Fontana
 2009 Enrico Franzoi
 2010 Marco Aurelio Fontana
 2011 Marco Aurelio Fontana
 2012 Marco Aurelio Fontana
 2013 Marco Aurelio Fontana
 2014 Marco Aurelio Fontana
 2015 Marco Aurelio Fontana
 2016 Gioele Bertolini
 2017 Gioele Bertolini
 2018 Luca Braidot
 2019 Gioele Bertolini
 2020 Jakob Dorigoni
 2021 Gioele Bertolini
 2022 Jakob Dorigoni

Cycle races in Italy
Recurring sporting events established in 1930
1930 establishments in Italy
National cyclo-cross championships
Clyco-cross